David "Aki" Collins is an American basketball coach.  Collins currently serves as an assistant coach for Penn State.

Collins is originally from Brooklyn and is a 1997 graduate of Clark Atlanta University.  Collins spent time as an assistant coach at University of Colorado (1997-2000), Howard University (2000-2003), Marshall University (2003-2006), and Fairfield University (2006-2008) before accepting a position at Marquette under Buzz Williams.  While at Marquette, Collins gained a reputation as a good recruiter, assisting the Golden Eagles to two top-25 ranked recruiting classes during his tenure.

On May 27, 2012, Collins accepted an assistant coach position at the University of Memphis.  In Collins' first few months with the program, he assisted the Tigers in securing the commitment of highly ranked frontcourt player Kuran Iverson.

External links
University of Memphis profile
Marquette assistant Aki Collins joining Memphis staff by Brooks Hansen, Memphisroar.com, May 27, 2012
University of Memphis Tigers basketball program hiring assistant Aki Collins from Marquette by John Martin & Jason Smith, The Commercial Appeal, May 27, 2012

References

Basketball coaches from New York (state)
Living people
Year of birth missing (living people)
Clark Atlanta University alumni
Sportspeople from the Bronx
Colorado Buffaloes men's basketball coaches
Howard Bison men's basketball coaches
Marshall Thundering Herd men's basketball coaches
Fairfield Stags men's basketball coaches
Memphis Tigers men's basketball coaches
Marquette Golden Eagles men's basketball coaches